Constance Lorraine Stubbs (born 9 June 1950) is a Canadian equestrian. She competed at the 1972 Summer Olympics and the 1976 Summer Olympics.

References

External links
 

1950 births
Living people
Canadian female equestrians
Olympic equestrians of Canada
Equestrians at the 1972 Summer Olympics
Equestrians at the 1976 Summer Olympics
Equestrians at the 1971 Pan American Games
Equestrians at the 1975 Pan American Games
Equestrians at the 1991 Pan American Games
Pan American Games gold medalists for Canada
Pan American Games silver medalists for Canada
Pan American Games medalists in equestrian
Sportspeople from Toronto
Medalists at the 1991 Pan American Games
20th-century Canadian women
21st-century Canadian women